

Boiling point 

In the following table, the use row is the value recommended for use in other Wikipedia pages in order to maintain consistency across content.

Table

Notes 
 Unless noted, all values refer to the normal boiling point at standard pressure (101.325 kPa).

References

Zhang et al.

WebEl 
As quoted at http://www.webelements.com/ from these sources:

CRC

Lange 
As quoted from:

Otozai et al.

Lavrukhina et al.

See also 
 Melting points of the elements (data page)
 Densities of the elements (data page)

Properties of chemical elements
Chemical element data pages